Cláudio Rogério Almeida Cogo or simply Claudinho (born August 25, 1977 in Manoel Viana), is a Brazilian left back. He plays for São Gabriel-RS.

Contract
7 March 2008 to 15 September 2008

External links
 CBF

1977 births
Living people
Brazilian footballers
Sociedade Esportiva e Recreativa Caxias do Sul players
Clube do Remo players
Rio Branco Esporte Clube players
Club Athletico Paranaense players
Association football defenders